The 2014 Trenton Freedom season was the first season as a professional indoor football franchise and their first in the Professional Indoor Football League (PIFL). One of 8 teams that competed in the PIFL for the 2014 season.

In August 2013, Owners Dennis Williams and Michael Schubiger announced their intentions to bring an indoor football team back to Trenton, New Jersey. The owners held name the team contest, and picked the name "Freedom," as well as named Adam Turkel to be the team's first head coach and general manager. When looking for a league to play in, Williams and Schubiger both were lobbying to become members of the Professional Indoor Football League (PIFL). In September, the team officially became the 7th member of the PIFL for the 2014 season. In November 2013, the team announced that they were replacing Turkel with Kevin O'Hanlon as the team's inaugural coach.

The Freedom began their inaugural season on March 30, 2014 at home, defeating the Richmond Raiders 52–17. Quarterback Warren Smith threw for four touchdowns and ran for two more. Defensive Back Domonic Joseph was named PIFL Defensive Player of the Week. The Freedom lost their first road game, 48–47 at the Lehigh Valley Steelhawks. Wide receiver Antoine Rivera caught 13 passes for 132 yards and a pair of touchdowns.

The Freedom rebounded in their second home game for a 66–63 win over the Columbus Lions. The Freedom suffered their second road loss, 42–36 at Lehigh Valley April 26, but linebacker Jeffery Morgan earned the franchise's second PIFL Defensive Player of the Week honor by scoring a pair of touchdowns. Success continued at home May 3, as the Freedom rallied with 16 points in the last two minutes to edge Richmond, 33–32, with Marques Slocum earning PIFL Defensive Player of the Week. The winning trend at home continued May 11 with a 52–39 triumph over the Harrisburg Stampede as William Hollis was named PIFL Defensive Player of the week, the team's third straight selection.

With a 52–42 win at Richmond, May 17, the Freedom recorded the franchise's first-ever road victory. The following week, back at home, the Freedom avenged two earlier losses to Lehigh Valley with a 55–42 victory to push their record to a PIFL-best 6–2 atop the National Conference.

The Freedom, with a 57–49 win at Harrisburg June 7, clinched a PIFL playoff berth in its first season in moving to 7–2.

With a 49–47 comeback win over the defending PIFL champion Alabama Hammers June 14, the Freedom clinched the regular-season National Conference title and a home playoff game in the franchise's first season.

The Freedom dropped a 52–49 decision to the Georgia Fire in the team's final regular-season home game. 

The Freedom finished the regular season with an 8–4 record, the 2nd best in the league, but were defeated by the Lehigh Valley Steelhawks in the National Conference Championship Game by a score of 49–38.

Schedule
Key:

Regular season
All start times are local to home team

Postseason
All start times are local to home team

Roster

Division standings

References

External links
2014 results

Trenton Freedom
2014 in sports in New Jersey
Trenton Freedom